Pi de Bruijn (born 28 August 1942) is a Dutch architect from Losser, Overijssel, the Netherlands .  He is a design principal at the Office de Architecten Cie., located in Amsterdam.

History
Bruijn graduated from the Delft University of Technology.

He won the second prize, awarded in 1993, in the design competition for the revisioning project of the Reichstag building in newly reunified Berlin.    

Bruijn is an officer of the Order of Orange-Nassau.

References

1942 births
Living people
Architects from Amsterdam
Delft University of Technology alumni
Officers of the Order of Orange-Nassau
People from Losser
20th-century Dutch architects
21st-century Dutch architects